Yo quiero ser hombre ("I Want to be a Man") is a 1950 Mexican film. It stars Alma Rosa Aguirre, Abel Salazar and Sara García.

External links
 

1950 films
1950s Spanish-language films
Mexican black-and-white films
Mexican comedy films
1950 comedy films
1940s Mexican films
1950s Mexican films